America's Greatest Hero is the only studio album by Joey Scarbury, released by Elektra Records in 1981 on vinyl LP and cassette. This album features the hit theme from the TV series The Greatest American Hero, from which the album takes its name.

The album was reissued on CD by Collectables Records in 2005.

Track listing
"Theme from The Greatest American Hero (Believe It or Not)" (Mike Post, Stephen Geyer) - 3:13 
"Love Me Like the Last Time"  (Dan Seals, Rafe Van Hoy) - 3:31 
"Stolen Night"  (Randy Handley) - 4:18 
"There Is a River"  (Stephen Geyer) - 3:31 
"Everything But Love"  (Stephen Geyer, Joey Scarbury) - 3:24 
"Take This Heart of Mine"  (Bruce Hornsby) - 2:59 
"When She Dances"  (Brian Blugerman) - 3:22 
"That Little Bit of Us"  (Stephen Geyer) - 3:41 
"Some of My Old Friends"  (Stephen Geyer) - 3:01 
"Down the Backstairs (Of My Life)" - (William Smith, Eric Mercury)  3:26

Personnel
Mike Baird - drums
Neil Stubenhaus, Leland Sklar - bass
John Goux, Larry Carlton, Stephen Geyer - guitar
Larry Muhoberac - keyboards
Ian Underwood, Todd Cochran, Larry Muhoberac - synthesizer
Jeff Gerson - percussion
Linda Dillard, Herb Pedersen, Laura Mumford, Joey Scarbury - backing vocals
Sid Sharp - concertmaster

Production
Producer - Mike Post
Arranger - Mike Post, Stephen Geyer
Recording/Mixing - Doug Parry at Smoketree Ranch, Chatsworth, CA
Second Engineer - Rick Romano
Strings Recording - Paul Dobbe at Western I
Photography - Jim Shea
Original Art Direction - Ron Coro

References

1981 debut albums
Joey Scarbury albums
Albums produced by Mike Post
Elektra Records albums